Zapatlela 2 is a Marathi horror comedy movie, which was released in 3D on 7 June 2013. It is directed by Mahesh Kothare and is the sequel to Zapatlela, released 20 years previously (in 1993). Zapatlela 2 is the first Marathi film shot entirely with a 3D camera.

Mahesh has stated that if the film did well, it would be dubbed into Hindi and a third movie in the series could be made.

Plot
The film opens within the mansion of Baba Chamatkar (Raghvendra Kadkol). Kubdya Khavis has escaped from the prison and  secured the doll containing the soul of gangster Tatya Vinchu (shown in the previous film, Zapatlela) and orders Baba Chamatkar to revive Tatya Vinchu again. He admits that the diamonds worth 5 crore which are now worth 50 crores were stolen by him and Tatya but only Tatya knows its location. He plans to sap all the information and kill Tatya again. He also offers Baba half of the cost of diamonds in return for reviving Tatya. However, Baba refuses to commit the same mistake again. Infuriated, Kubdya tries to kill him using a trishul (a weapon which looks like a trident). However, Baba uses the same weapon to kill him. A drop of Kubdya's blood is accidentally transferred towards the doll, which resuscitates Tatya Vinchu. Tatya confronts Baba Chamatkar and forces him to tell how to migrate to a human form. Baba resists in thee victim (Tatya) must make use of the Mrutyunjaya Mantra on the person to whom he has confessed his true name. But now that the person (Lakshya, portrayed by Laxmikant Berde in Zapatlela) is dead, the same mantra can be used on his son. Tatya vows to find Lakshya's son and migrate into his body.

Meanwhile, at Shrirangpur, a jatra (village fair) has been organized dedicated to the village deity. Aditya Bolke (Adinath Kothare) is a mechanical engineer without a job, and like his father, is thoroughly interested in ventriloquism. He lives with his grandmother (Madhu Kambikar). Aditya meets Megha (Sonalee Kulkarni), who is on a vacation and is a lavani dancer at her mother's (Vishakha Subhedar) theater within the fair. Aditya and Megha fall in love with each other. Meanwhile, Makarand/Makya (Makarand Anaspure) has set up his ventriloquist theater (puppet show) and wishes to make a healthy profit from this fair. He has created a doll which resembles Tatya Vinchu, after hearing the local legend, although he himself is skeptic about it.

Aditya frequently tries to meet Makarand and learn about ventriloquism, but is challenged by the theater's security guard (Deepak Shirke), and the chase often ends up funnily. Gauri Wagh (Sai Tamhankar) is a journalist and has arrived to Shrirangpur to cover a report on the fair. Meanwhile, Tatya arrives in the fair and identifies Aditya as the son of Lakshya. Gauri, in a small incident, discovers that the doll is, in fact, alive. Aditya accidentally gets hold of Tatya Vinchu, and after taking it home, discovers that the doll is alive. However, being an engineer, he thinks that the doll is battery powered.

Police Commissioner Mahesh Jadhav (Mahesh Kothare) investigates the death of Kubdya Khavis and is notified that Baba Chamatkar (who has passed into a coma after being confronted by Tatya), has revived. Baba tells Mahesh that Tatya has in fact been revived. Mahesh instructs the police at Shrirangpur to find the doll. He then travels to Shrirangpur and meets Inspector Sakharam (Vijay Chavan, who has been portrayed as Sakhya Havaldar in the prequel). Sakharam tells him that the doll has been located (which is in fact the replica created by Makarand). The police destroy the doll in a bonfire.

On the last day of the fair, Makarand is confronted by Tatya Vinchu, who threatens him at knifepoint and takes him to Aditya's house. He confronts his grandmother, who runs to Inspector Sakharam and tells him that Tatya is on his way to Aditya, who is at a religious procession at the fair. Tatya makes his way to Aditya, who travels up the Ferris wheel to save himself. However, the wheel gets stuck up. Tatya climbs up to him and tries to recite the mantra on Aditya. However, Mahesh (who has been communicated by Sakharam) reaches in time and shoots Tatya between his eyebrows. Tatya falls down, and is picked up by Mahesh. However, Tatya uses Mahesh's revolver gun and shoots him in his arm. Tatya goes back to climb up and reach Aditya. Aditya picks up a coconut knife and severs Tatya's head. Mahesh finds Tatya's headless body and orders the police that the case is not closed until the severed head is found. In the end scene, Tatya's head is shown to be resting (yet alive) under Mahesh's car.

Cast
 Adinath Kothare as Aditya Bolke, son of Laxmikant Bolke
 Dilip Prabhavalkar as the voice of Tatya Vinchu
 Sonalee Kulkarni as Megha Satarkar
 Sai Tamhankar as Gauri Wagh
 Makarand Anaspure as Makarand Vatvate/Makya
 Vishakha Subhedar as Megha's Mother
 Madhu Kambikar as Parobai Bolke (Aditya's Grandmother)
 Mahesh Kothare as Police Commissioner Mahesh Jadhav
 Raghvendra Kadkol as Baba Chamatkar
 Vijay Chavan as Inspector Sakharam
 Umesh Tonpe as Aditya's Friend
 Abhijeet Chavan as Kubdya Khavis
 Jitendra Joshi as Vinayak Chitre/V.Chitre (Cameo)
 Shiva as R.G. Kapoor
 Prabhas Sreenu as Seenu

Production
The puppet Tatya Vinchu which featured in the original film returned in Zapatlela 2. The ventriloquist and puppeteer Ramdas Padhye, creator and operator of the original Tatya Vinchu, created a more sophisticated puppet for the sequel.

Around ₹1.7 crore was spent on 3D and visual effects.

Reception
Times of India gave Zapatlela 2, 3.5/5 stars.

Soundtrack

The film's soundtrack was composed by Avdhoot Gupte, with lyrics penned by Guru Thakur.
The film's title theme track was composed by Aniruddha Kale

Track list

References

External links 
 
 Zapatlela 2 at Gomolo.com

2013 comedy horror films
2013 films
2013 3D films
Indian 3D films
Viacom18 Studios films
2010s Marathi-language films
Indian comedy horror films
Films directed by Mahesh Kothare
2013 comedy films
Indian science fiction films